Əmircan (also, Amirabdzhan, Amiradzhan, Amiradzhany, Amircan, Amirdžan, Amirjan, and Amirdzhan) is a municipality in Baku, Azerbaijan.  It has a population of 28,203.

Notable natives 

 Abbasgulu Bakikhanov —  historian and writer; founder of Azerbaijani scientific historiography.
 Sattar Bahlulzade — painter, People's Painter of Azerbaijan SSR (1964),  is the founder of contemporary Azerbaijani landscape painting.
 Albert Agarunov - National Hero of Azerbaijan
Murtuza Mukhtarov
Zeynal Zeynalov (politician)

References 

Populated places in Baku